The 14th Pan American Games were held in Santo Domingo, Dominican Republic from August 1 to August 17, 2003.

Results by event

Swimming

Men's Competition

See also
 Aruba at the 2002 Central American and Caribbean Games
 Aruba at the 2004 Summer Olympics

References

Nations at the 2003 Pan American Games
P
2003